There are 71 known taxa of birds endemic to the Hawaiian Islands, of which 30 are extinct, 6 possibly extinct and 30 of the remaining 48 species and subspecies are listed as endangered or threatened by the United States Fish and Wildlife Service. Habitat loss and avian disease are thought to have had the greatest effect on endemic bird species in Hawaii.

List of species 
The following is a list of bird species and subspecies endemic to the Hawaiian Islands:

Procellariidae 
 Hawaiian petrel or uau, Pterodroma sandwichensis 
 Newell's shearwater or ao, Puffinus newelli 
 Bryan's shearwater, Puffinus bryani 
 Bonin petrel, Pterodroma hypoleuca  99% of the total population breeds on the Northwestern Hawaiian Islands

Anatidae 
 Hawaiian goose or nēnē, Branta sandvicensis 
 Hawaiian duck or koloa maoli, Anas wyvilliana 
 Laysan duck, Anas laysanensis

Diomedeidae 
 Laysan albatross, Phoebastria immutabilis  99.7% of the total population breeds on the Northwestern Hawaiian Islands
 Black-footed albatross, Phoebastria nigripes  97.5% of the total population breeds on the Northwestern Hawaiian Islands

Accipitridae 
 Hawaiian hawk or io, Buteo solitarius

Rallidae 
 Laysan rail, Porzana palmeri † 
 Hawaiian rail or moho, Porzana sandwichensis † 
 Hawaiian gallinule or alae ula, Gallinula chloropus sandwichensis
 Hawaiian coot or alae keokeo, Fulica alai

Recurvirostridae 
 Hawaiian stilt or aeo, Himantopus mexicanus knudseni 

Laridae 
 Hawaiian (black) noddy or noio,  Anous minutus melanogenys

Strigidae 
 Pueo, Asio flammeus sandwichensis 

Mohoidae 
 Kauai ōō, Moho braccatus † 
 Oahu ōō, Moho apicalis † 
 Bishop's ōō, Moho bishopi † 
 Hawaii ōō, Moho nobilis † 
 Kioea, Chaetoptila angustipluma †

Corvidae 
 Hawaiian crow or alala, Corvus hawaiiensis

Monarchidae 
 Kauai elepaio, Chasiempis sclateri 
 Oahu elepaio, Chasiempis ibidis 
 Hawaii elepaio, Chasiempis sandwichensis

Sylviidae 
 Laysan millerbird, Acrocephalus familaris familaris † 
 Nihoa millerbird, Acrocephalus familaris kingi

Turdidae 
 Kamao, Myadestes myadestinus † 
Puaiohi, Myadestes palmeri 
 Olomao, Myadestes lanaiensis 
Āmaui, Myadestes (lanaiensis) woahensis † 
 Omao, Myadestes obscurus

Fringillidae 
 Laysan finch, Telespiza cantans 
 Nihoa finch, Telespiza ultima 
 Ōū, Psittirostra psittacea 
 Lanai hookbill, Dysmorodrepanis munroi † 
 Palila, Loxioides bailleui 
 Kauai palila, Loxioides kikuichi † 
 Lesser koa-finch, Rhodacanthis flaviceps † 
 Greater koa-finch, Rhodacanthis palmeri † 
 Kona grosbeak, Chloridops kona † 
 Maui parrotbill, Pseudonestor xanthophrys 
 Kauai akialoa Akialoa stejnegeri or Hemignathus (ellisianus) procerus † 
 Oahu akialoa, Akialoa ellisiana or Hemignathus ellisianus ellisianus † 
 Maui Nui akialoa, Akialoa lanaiensis or Hemignathus (ellisianus) lanaiensis †   
 Lesser akialoa, Akialoa obscura or Hemignathus obscurus † 
 Common amakihi, Hemignathus virens 
 Oahu amakihi, Hemignathus flavus 
 Kauai amakihi, Hemignathus kauaiensis 
 Greater amakihi, Hemignathus sagittirostris † 
 Maui nukupuu, Hemignathus affinis 
 Kauai nukupuu, Hemignathus hanapepe 
 Oʻahu nukupuu, Hemignathus lucidus † 
 Giant nukupuu, Hemignathus vorpalis † 
 Akiapolaau, Hemignathus munroi 
 Anianiau, Magumma parva 
 Akikiki, Oreomystis bairdi 
 Hawaii creeper, Oreomystis mana 
 Oahu alauahio, Paroreomyza maculata 
 Maui alauahio, Paroreomyza montana 
 Lanai alauahio, Paroreomyza montana montana † 
 Kakawahie, Paroreomyza flammea † 
 Akekee, Loxops caeruleirostris 
 Hawaii akepa, Loxops coccineus 
 Maui ākepa, Loxops coccineus ochraceus † 
 Oahu ākepa, Loxops coccineus wolstenholmei † 
 Ula-ai-hawane, Ciridops anna † 
 Iiwi, Vestiaria coccinea 
 Hawaii mamo, Drepanis pacifica † 
 Black mamo, Drepanis funerea † 
 Akohekohe, Palmeria dolei 
 Apapane, Himatione sanguinea 
 Laysan honeycreeper, Himatione fraithii † 
 Poouli, Melamprosops phaeosoma †

See also 
 List of birds of Hawaii
 List of bird species introduced to the Hawaiian Islands
 Endemism in the Hawaiian Islands
 List of extinct animals of the Hawaiian Islands

References 
 (2005).  Hawaii's Birds.  Hawaii Audubon Society. Sixth ed.

External links 
 USGS Biology Programs, Informative site but species classification is out of date
 IUCN Redlist of Threatened Species
 Hawai'i's Endemic Forest Birds - Distribution, Status and Population Updates 2002
 Hawaii's Species of Greatest Conservation Need: Process and SGCN Fact Sheets

Hawaii
 
Hawaii
Birds, endemic